This article presents a list of the historical events and publications of Australian literature during 1943.

Books 

 Max Harris – The Vegetative Eye
 Michael Innes – The Weight of the Evidence
 G. B. Lancaster – Grand Parade
 Philip Lindsay – The Devil and King John
 Kylie Tennant
 Ride on Stranger
 Time Enough Later

Children's 

 May Gibbs – Mr. & Mrs. Bear and Friends
 P. L. Travers – Mary Poppins Opens the Door

Short stories 

 Marjorie Barnard – The Persimmon Tree and Other Stories
 James Hackston – "Father Clears Out"
 Myra Morris – "Going Home"
 Dal Stivens – "The Perch"

Poetry 

 David Campbell
 "Men in Green"
 "Soldier's Song"
 "The Stockman"
 Rosemary Dobson – "Child with a Cockatoo"
 A. D. Hope – "Observation Car"
 Rex Ingamells – New Song in an Old Land (edited)
 Will Lawson – Bush Verses
 Kenneth Slessor – "A Bushranger"
 Douglas Stewart – "The Dosser in Springtime"
 Judith Wright
 "Legend"
 "South of My Days"
 "The Trains"

Awards and honours

Literary

Births 

A list, ordered by date of birth (and, if the date is either unspecified or repeated, ordered alphabetically by surname) of births in 1943 of Australian literary figures, authors of written works or literature-related individuals follows, including year of death.

 9 January – Robert Drewe, novelist
 29 April – John Tranter, poet
 30 April – Paul Jennings, writer for children
 7 May – Peter Carey, novelist
 17 May – Robert Adamson, poet (died 2022)
 19 June – Barry Hill, poet and journalist
 16 August – Dennis Altman, author and academic
24 August – Judith Clarke, writer for children and young adults (died 2020)
 22 September – Dale Spender, author

Deaths 

A list, ordered by date of death (and, if the date is either unspecified or repeated, ordered alphabetically by surname) of deaths in 1943 of Australian literary figures, authors of written works or literature-related individuals follows, including year of birth.

 3 October – Ida Lee, historian and poet (born 1865) 
 27 November – Louis Esson, poet and playwright (born 1878)

See also 
 1943 in poetry
 List of years in literature
 List of years in Australian literature
 1943 in literature
 1942 in Australian literature
 1943 in Australia
 1944 in Australian literature

References

Literature
Australian literature by year
20th-century Australian literature
1943 in literature